Acacia tetanophylla is a shrub of the genus Acacia and the subgenus Plurinerves that is endemic to an area of south western Australia.

Description
Like most species of Acacia it has phyllodes rather than true leaves. The ascending to erect, rigid and grey-green phyllodes are usually straight and threadlike with a hexagonal cross-section when young. It blooms from August to October and produces yellow flowers. The simple inflorescences are composed of spherical flower-heads with a diameter of  containing 13 to 18 usually golden coloured flowers.

Taxonomy
The species was first formally described by the botanist Bruce Maslin in 1977 as a part of the work Studies in the genus Acacia (Mimosaceae) - Miscellany as published in the journal Nuytsia. It was reclassified by Leslie Pedley in 2003 as Racosperma tetanophyllum then transferred back to genus Acacia in 2006.

Distribution
It is native to an area in the Great Southern, Goldfields-Esperance and Wheatbelt regions of Western Australia where it is commonly situated on plains along creeks and rivers growing in rock or sandy loams or sandy-clay or sandy soils often over or around granite. The range extends from just south of the Stirling Range in the north-west out to around Ravensthorpe in the south east with outliers near Nyabing and Lake King both of which are further north.

See also
List of Acacia species

References

tetanophylla
Acacias of Western Australia
Taxa named by Bruce Maslin
Plants described in 1977